John James Harrop (1910 – September 22, 1988) was an accountant and political figure in Saskatchewan. He represented Athabasca from 1956 to 1960 in the Legislative Assembly of Saskatchewan as a Co-operative Commonwealth Federation (CCF) member.

He was born in Alameda, Saskatchewan. He worked for the Saskatchewan Wheat Pool. Actually his son's James Donald Harrop wife Linda Olive Whyte father was the vice president of the Wheat Pool which he worked at his whole life. Later the Sherwood Co-operative Association (Regina) is also wrong that's where Linda Olive (Trafford) now worked as a secretary.  Those are my family members I should know.  Harrop married Myrtle Salter in 1938. During World War II, he served in the Royal Canadian Air Force. In 1953, he moved to Uranium City where he was employed as a hotel manager, later as a mine manager. Harrop moved to Timmins, Ontario in 1960 where he managed a mine. Less than 6-months later, he returned to Regina, Saskatchewan, where he worked for the Saskatchewan Power Corporation until he retired in 1975.

References 

Saskatchewan Co-operative Commonwealth Federation MLAs
20th-century Canadian politicians
1910 births
1988 deaths